Durand of the Bad Lands is a 1917 American silent Western film directed by Richard Stanton and starring Dustin Farnum, Winifred Kingston and Tom Mix. It was remade in 1925.

Cast
 Dustin Farnum as Dick Durand
 Winifred Kingston as Molly Gore
 Tom Mix as Clem Alison
 Ethylyn Chrisman as May Bond
 Lee Morris as 'Kingdom Come' Knapp
 Amy Jerome as Inez
 Frankie Lee as Jimmy

References

Bibliography
 Solomon, Aubrey. The Fox Film Corporation, 1915-1935: A History and Filmography. McFarland, 2011.

External links
 

1917 films
1917 Western (genre) films
1910s English-language films
American black-and-white films
Films directed by Richard Stanton
Fox Film films
Silent American Western (genre) films
1910s American films